Florian Krumrey (born 27 January 1970) is a German former professional tennis player.

Biography
Born in Munich, Krumrey grew up in the nearby Bavarian town of Prien am Chiemsee and started competing professionally in 1987.

Krumey made his ATP Tour main draw debut at the 1991 Kremlin Cup and had his best performance at the 1992 Prague Open, reaching the second round.

During his career he featured in the qualifying draws for all four grand slam tournaments.

Krumey now works in sports marketing.

References

External links
 
 

1970 births
Living people
West German male tennis players
German male tennis players
Tennis players from Munich